22 Aquilae, abbreviated 22 Aql, is a star in the equatorial constellation of Aquila. 22 Aquilae is its Flamsteed designation. It is a faint star but visible to the naked eye with an apparent visual magnitude of 5.59. It is moving closer to the Earth with a heliocentric radial velocity of −23 km/s.

Cowley et al. (1969) assigned this star a stellar classification of A3 IV, matching an evolving subgiant star that has exhausted the hydrogen at its core. Houk and Swift (1999) reassigned it as an A-type main-sequence star with a class of A1 V. It has nearly three times the mass of the Sun and is spinning with a projected rotational velocity of 70 km/s. The star is radiating 161 times the Sun's luminosity from its photosphere at an effective temperature of 8,453 K.

References

A-type main-sequence stars
A-type subgiants
Aquila (constellation)
Durchmusterung objects
Aquilae, 22
180482
094727
7303